Wallsend, an electoral district of the Legislative Assembly in the Australian state of New South Wales, has had four incarnations, the first from 1894 to 1904, the second from 1917 to the 1920, the third from 1927 to 1930, and the fourth from 1968 to the present.


Members

Election results

Elections in the 2010s

2019

2015

2011

Elections in the 2000s

2007

2003

Elections in the 1990s

1999

1995

1991

Elections in the 1980s

1988 by-election

1988

1984

1981

Elections in the 1970s

1978

1976

1973

1971

Elections in the 1960s

1968

1930 - 1968
District abolished

Elections in the 1920s

1927

1920 - 1927
District abolished

Elections in the 1910s

1917

1913

1904 - 1913
District abolished

Elections in the 1900s

1901

Elections in the 1890s

1898

1895

1894

Notes

References

New South Wales state electoral results by district